Ásmegin is a Norwegian folk/viking metal band formed in 1998. The name comes from Old Norse and means "Might of the Æsir" or "Might of the Gods". Ásmegin's lyrics are written in Norwegian as well as some in Old Norse and older Norwegian. Some of the tracks on Hin vordende Sod og Sø are modeled after the Norwegian play Peer Gynt by Henrik Ibsen.

Current line-up 
 Erik Rasmussen - harsh vocals, drums (2003—present)
 Lars Fredrik Frøislie - keyboards, piano, mellotron (2003—present)
 Marius Olaussen - guitars, bass, mandolin, accordion, mellotron, piano (1998—present)
 Raymond Håkenrud - guitars, bass, vocals, piano (2001—present)
 Tomas Torgersbråten - bass (1998—present) (is not playing on "Arv")

Former members
 Bjørn Olav Holter - vocals (2001—2003)
 Skule Jarl (Nordalv) - drums (1998—2001)
 Iving Mundilfarne - flute, guitars (1998—1999)
 Auðrvinr Sigurdsson - guitars, vocals (1998—2001)
 Anders Torp - drums (1999)
 Tommy Brandt - drums (2001—2007)
 Ingvild Johannesen (Sareeta) - vocals & fiddle (2003—2007)
 Lars Nedland - clean vocals

Discography 
Studio albums
 Hin Vordende Sod & Sø (2003)
 Arv (2008)

Naar Rimkalkene Heves
Naar Rimkalkene Heves is a demo released on September 1, 1999 by Valgalder Records.
Track listing
 "Valgalder" –	4:54	
 "Alvesang Fager" – 4:12	
 "Over Havet" –	3:45	
 "Vargdans" – 4:18
Personnel
Auðrvinr Sigurdsson – lead vocals
Marius Olaussen – lead and rhythm guitars, synth, vocals
Tomas Torgersbråten – bass, backing vocals
Martin Kneppen – drums, backing vocals
Anders Torp – drums

See also
 Solefald - Another Lars Nedland project, Sareeta also played Violin on their albums, Red For Fire: An Icelandic Odyssey Part 1 and Black for Death: An Icelandic Odyssey Part 2.
 Ram-Zet - An avant-garde metal band where Sareeta plays violin

External links 
Ásmegin at Napalm Records

Norwegian black metal musical groups
Norwegian folk metal musical groups
Norwegian viking metal musical groups
Musical groups established in 1998
1998 establishments in Norway
Musical quintets
Napalm Records artists